Sanjay Balaso Patil is an Indian Politician from the state of Karnataka. He is a two term member of the Karnataka Legislative Assembly.

Constituency
He represents the Belgaum Rural constituency.

Political Party
He is from the Bharatiya Janata Party.

References 

Karnataka MLAs 2008–2013
Karnataka MLAs 2013–2018
Living people
Bharatiya Janata Party politicians from Karnataka
People from Belagavi district
1970 births